The Order of Manuel Amador Guerrero is the highest honour of Panama.  Named after Manuel Amador Guerrero, the first president of Panama, the order was established on the 50th anniversary of Panama's independence on 29 October 1953.  It is awarded to recognize distinguished people (Panamanians and non-Panamanians) in the sciences, arts, and politics.

Grades 
There are four grades of the order:
 Collar (Collar)
 Grand-Cross (Gran-Cruz)
 Grand-Officer (Gran-Oficial)
 Commander (Comendador)

Awardees

Collar 
 Elizabeth II, Queen of 7 States at the time of appointment, 29 November 1953
 Josip Broz Tito, Yugoslav Marshal and President of the Socialist Federal Republic of Yugoslavia, 15 March 1976
 Don Juan Carlos I, King of Spain, 16 September 1977
 Fra' Andrew Bertie, Grand-Master of the Sovereign Military Hospitaller Order of Saint John of Jerusalem, of Rhodes and of Malta, 2000
 Fernando Henrique Cardoso, President of the Federative Republic of Brazil, 8 August 2001
 Akihito, Emperor of Japan
 Rainier III, Sovereign Prince of Monaco
 Julio María Sanguinetti Coirolo, former President of the Oriental Republic of Uruguay
 Juscelino Kubitschek de Oliveira, President of the Federative Republic of Brazil
 Nicos Anastasiades, President of Cyprus, 23 July 2013

Grand-Cross 
 Philip, Duke of Edinburgh, Prince Consort of 7 States at the time of appointment, 29 November 1953
 Carlos González Parrodi, 1981
 Carmen Romano, 1981
 Alfonso de Rosenzweig Díaz, 1981
 Luis G. Zorrilla, 1981
 Fredrick Chien, Minister of Foreign Affairs of the Republic of China, 1994
 Eduardo Valdés Escoffery, 1994
 Howard Baker Jr., 2001
 Dionisio de Gracia Guillén, 2001
 Suleiman Tayeb Ahmed Salem, 24 January 2008
 Juan Daniel Alemán, General Secretary of the Central American Integration System, 11 October 2010
 Juan Pablo de Laiglesia, 18 November 2011
 Patriarch Theophilos III of Jerusalem, 1 June 2012
 Yuan-Tseh Lee, 17 October 2012
 Lawrence Edward Chewning Fábrega, Ambassador to the Organization of American States and Vatican City 18 August 2014
 Dionisio Johnson, 30 December 2015

Grand-Officer 
 Sir Anthony Bailey, interfaith campaigner
 Martin D. Young
 Sir Sean Connery, 11 March 2003
 Paxson Offield, 2005
 Robert Berry, 2005
 Elsie Alvarado de Ricord, 2005
 Eric Douglas Green, 17 October 2012
 Dwight D. Eisenhower, President of the United States of America

Commander 
 Jorge Illueca, sometime President of the Republic of Panama
 José López Portillo, President of the Mexican United States, 1981
 Carlos Menem, President of the Argentine Republic, 1994
 Sebastián Piñera, later President of the Republic of Chile, 2013

Unknown grade 
 Eugene N. S. Girard II
 Anil K. Dhingra, 1997
 Paul R. Noland, 1997
 Jorge Alessandri Rodríguez, President of Chile
 Enrique Berruga, 1 June 2001
 Fire Department of New York, 27 November 2001
 Harriet Mayor Fulbright
 Jimmy Carter, President of the United States of America
 Karl Johnson, 2001
 Ramiro Ordóñez Jonama, 2001
 Ricardo M. Alba, 2002
 Harold Bernstein, 2002
 Raul Orillac Arango, 2003
 Matt Kim, 2012
 David Rockefeller
 Harold Christian Hofmann 2007
 Luis Anderson McNeil

References 

Orders, decorations, and medals of Panama
Manuel Amador Guerrero, Order of
Awards established in 1953
1953 establishments in Panama